Direh Rural District is a rural district (dehestan) in the Central District of Gilan-e Gharb County, Kermanshah Province, Iran. At the 2006 census, its population was 4,530, in 974 families. The rural district has 28 villages.

References 

Rural Districts of Kermanshah Province
Gilan-e Gharb County